Cumann Gaeilge na hEaglaise (English: Irish Guild of the Church of Ireland) is the Irish language society of the Church of Ireland.  The society was founded in 1914, with aims to:
 promote the preservation of the spirit of the ancient Celtic Church within the Church of Ireland, and provide a focus for members of the church inspired by Irish ideals, 
 promote the use of the Irish language within the church, 
 collect hymns and other appropriate spiritual material of Irish origin,
 promote the use of Irish music and art in the church.

The society provided a bilingual service book to allow Irish and English to be used in parallel.

External links
 Cumann Gaeilge na hEaglaise Website
 Cumann Gaeilge na hEaglaise - Facebook Page

References

1914 establishments in Ireland
Irish language organisations
Organizations established in 1914